Pamela Isley, commonly known as Poison Ivy, is a fictional character who appears in Joel Schumacher's 1997 superhero film Batman & Robin. Based on the DC Comics character of the same name, she is portrayed by American actress Uma Thurman.

Character arc
Dr. Pamela Isley is a botanist, working for Wayne Enterprises' arboreal preservation project in South America. She is experimenting with Venom to create animal-plant cross-breedings capable of fighting back and protecting the world's plants from "the thoughtless ravages of man". However, her senior colleague, Dr. Jason Woodrue (John Glover), steals some of her Venom samples in order to transform a prisoner into Bane (Robert Swenson). When Isely rejects Woodrue's advances, he tries to kill her by shoving her into shelves lined with beakers containing Venom and other animal-plant toxins, transforming her into a poisonous hybrid of human and plant. She kills Woodrue by passionately kissing him with her now-poisonous lips, and vows to establish botanical supremacy over the world.

At a charity ball, she unexpectedly appears in order to get the Heart of Isis diamond necklace. Blowing around a wisp of pheromone dust in order to make the men in the room her willing slaves, she offers the auctioneers a night with her. Batman (George Clooney) and Robin (Chris O'Donnell), also intoxicated by the pheromone dust, begin competing for her affections, straining their partnership. Poison Ivy also uses her pheromones to make Police Commissioner James Gordon (Pat Hingle) fall in love with her in order to get the keys to police headquarters and the Bat-Signal; she then almost kills him with her toxic kiss before changing her mind because he is "too old".

She allies herself with Bane and Mr. Freeze (Arnold Schwarzenegger), and plans to freeze the Earth with a giant freezing cannon, which will destroy the human race and enable Poison Ivy's mutant plants to "overrun the globe". She ensures Freeze's cooperation by pulling the plug on his cryogenically frozen wife Nora, and convincing him that Batman did it. Ivy then lures an infatuated Robin to her garden hideout by altering the Bat-Signal it to a "Robin-Signal". She then tries to kill him with a venomous kiss; the attempt fails, however, as Robin had coated his lips with rubber. A furious Ivy throws Robin into her lily pond and entangles Batman in her vines, but they are able to free themselves when Batgirl (Alicia Silverstone) unexpectedly arrives and traps the villainess in her own floral throne.

After Batman, Robin and Batgirl foil the villains' plan, Ivy is imprisoned in Arkham Asylum with a vengeful Freeze, who now knows that she had tried to kill Nora, as her cellmate.

Background
Demi Moore, Sharon Stone, and Julia Roberts were considered for the role. Uma Thurman took the role because she liked the femme fatale characterization of Poison Ivy. Atsuko Tanaka provided Japanese dubbing for Thurman on the 2000 TV Asahi edition of Batman & Robin.

Screenwriter Akiva Goldsman drew inspiration from Neil Gaiman's revised origin story, Poison Ivy: Pavane, published in January 1989 in Secret Origins #36. In the story, Jason Woodrue turns Poison Ivy into a hybrid of human being and plant when he shoves her into a shelf filled with chemicals and plant toxins. The story also establishes that her real name is Pamela Isley; in the character's prior appearances in the comics, her real name was "Lillian Rose". Poison Ivy's disheveled appearance when imprisoned in Arkham Asylum resembles her comic counterpart's appearance in Secret Origins. Thurman as Poison Ivy wears two flamboyant spandex catsuits, a nod to her appearance in the Silver Age comics.

Connections to the comics
Isley makes her public debut as Poison Ivy at a charity auction featuring Batman and Robin. Batman and Robin's comic book counterparts have also been portrayed attending these kind of social events, such as a beauty contest in "Batman’s Marriage Trap" (Batman #214, August 1969). Meanwhile, the Poison Ivy of the comics, first appeared in "Beware of -- Poison Ivy!" (Batman #181, June 1966) making her debut at a pop art fashion show. Isley's gorilla dance at the fundraiser in Batman & Robin is based on Marlene Dietrich's "Hot Voodoo" number from the 1932 film Blonde Venus.

Later on in the film, Isley disguises herself in the backseat of a car with a wig in order to maneuver in public without being recognized.; a similar scene occurred in "A Sweet Kiss of Poison" (Batman #339, September 1981). Soon afterward in the story, she is able to get close to Bruce Wayne and cast her influence over him. This particular story arc is finally resolved in "Monster, My Sweet!" (Batman #344, February 1982). As was the case with Bane in Batman & Robin, Poison Ivy has a chauffeur (here, named Ivor, who was mutated as part of Isley's experiments to try and create a plant/human hybrid) who is slavishly devoted to her, communicates in short simple sentences, and attacks Batman on command.

Batman #339 featured Poison Ivy sending vines to attack and strangle Batman; this is similar to when Batman and Robin fall into her trap in Batman & Robin. The subsequent confrontation between Poison Ivy and Batgirl in the film showcased the former's skills at hand-to-hand combat, as also shown in Batman #344. This particular issue also shows her using a vine-like a whip and snaring an opponent's ankle, which she also does in the film.

Reception
Uma Thurman's performance as Poison Ivy was praised by critics and fans; the Houston Chronicle remarked that "Thurman [...] sometimes seems to be doing Mae West by way of Jessica Rabbit". A similar comparison was made by The New York Times: "[L]ike Mae West, she mixes true femininity with the winking womanliness of a drag queen". She won a Blockbuster Entertainment Award for Best Sci-fi Actress and was also nominated for Favourite Movie Actress at the Kids' Choice Awards. Thurman was also nominated for a Razzie Award for Worst Supporting Actress, but lost to her Batman & Robin co-star Alicia Silverstone.

See also
Victor Fries (Batman & Robin)

References

External links

The greatness of Uma Thurman's Poison Ivy - Syfy Wire
There is something significant about Poison Ivy’s costume in Batman & Robin
Uma Thurman’s Iconic Poison Ivy Role Deserves More Respect
How Batman & Robin's Poison Ivy Became an Unlikely Icon
You Tried: Uma Thurman in ‘Batman and Robin’
Batman Movie Villains: The Bad, the Badder, and the Ugly
POISON IVY SAVES ``BATMAN' FROM DOLDRUMS
What Poison Ivy Can Teach Us About Fighting Climate Change
Batman The Complete History: The Life and Times of the Dark Knight
The Encyclopedia of Epic Films
'Batman & Robin' at 20: Joel Schumacher and More Reveal What Really Happened
Batman & Robin: 5 Reasons Why It's The Perfect Guilty Pleasure (& 5 Why It's Just Terrible)
10 UNFORGETTABLE MOMENTS FROM JOEL SCHUMACHER'S BATMAN MOVIES
An ode to Batman & Robin, the terrible film that made me love cinema
Batman & Robin: The Apologies & Thoughts of Its Cast & Crew
‘Nymphomaniac’ Star Uma Thurman On ‘Kill Bill’ & What ‘Batman & Robin’ Has To Do With Gay Rights
Can we all just admit that Batman & Robin was kind of awesome?

Action film villains
Female film villains
Batman (1989 film series)
Batman live-action film characters
DC Comics female supervillains
DC Comics scientists
Fictional biochemists
Fictional botanists
Fictional conservationists and environmentalists
Fictional eco-terrorists
Fictional female doctors
Fictional hypnotists and indoctrinators
Fictional life scientists
Fictional mad scientists
Fictional murderers
Fictional rampage and spree killers
Fictional scientists in films
Film characters introduced in 1997
Film supervillains
Poison Ivy (character)